Killarney is a former provincial electoral division in Manitoba, Canada.

It was created for the 1888 provincial election, and abolished with the 1958 election.

Provincial representatives

Former provincial electoral districts of Manitoba